Matthew Jacob Fox (born December 4, 1982) is an American former professional baseball pitcher. He played in Major League Baseball (MLB) for the Minnesota Twins and Boston Red Sox.

Career
Fox was drafted by the Arizona Diamondbacks in the 6th round of the 2001 Major League Baseball Draft, but he did not sign. He instead opted to attend the University of Central Florida, where he played for the UCF Knights baseball team. As a junior, he was named conference Pitcher of the Year. He was a first round pick (35th overall) in the 2004 Major League Baseball Draft.

Fox was ranked the 11th best prospect in the Appalachian League by Baseball America in his first season in professional ball with the Elizabethton Twins.

He went 9-9 with a 3.58 ERA and 120 strikeouts in 2009 to help the Rock Cats to their first post season appearance since .

Fox was promoted to the major leagues for the first time on September 3, 2010. He earned a no decision in his major league debut that same day, pitching 5 innings in a 4-3 win for the Twins.  He was designated for assignment on September 4 to make room on the 40 man roster for Ben Revere.

On September 9, 2010, Fox was claimed off waivers by the Boston Red Sox. On September 17, 2010, he has made his debut with the Red Sox as a reliever, in a game against the Toronto Blue Jays. He was designated for assignment by the Red Sox after the season. He declared free agency after the 2011 season.

The Seattle Mariners signed Fox to a minor league contract on November 12, 2011. On May 14, 2013, the New York Mets signed Fox to minor league deal. He finished his professional career after spending the 2013 season with the Las Vegas 51s, going 8-4 with a 4.59 ERA.

References

External links

Living people
1982 births
Minnesota Twins players
Boston Red Sox players
Baseball players from Columbus, Ohio
Major League Baseball pitchers
UCF Knights baseball players
Elizabethton Twins players
Beloit Snappers players
Fort Myers Miracle players
New Britain Rock Cats players
Rochester Red Wings players
Pawtucket Red Sox players
Tacoma Rainiers players
Arizona League Mariners players
Jackson Generals (Southern League) players
York Revolution players
Las Vegas 51s players